"Lady Put the Light Out" is a 1977 song by British soft rock band Rogue. It was covered by Frankie Valli on his 1977 album Lady Put the Light Out, by Joe Cocker on his 1978 album Luxury You Can Afford, and by Tom Jones on his 1998 compilation album More Great Hits from Tom Jones.

References

1977 singles
Rogue (band) songs
Frankie Valli songs
Tom Jones (singer) songs
Joe Cocker songs
1977 songs
Songs written by Guy Fletcher (songwriter)
Songs written by Doug Flett
Epic Records singles